High-net-worth individual (HNWI) is a term used by some segments of the financial services industry to designate persons whose investible wealth (assets such as stocks and bonds) exceeds a given amount. Typically, these individuals are defined as holding financial assets (excluding their primary residence) with a value greater than US$1 million.

"Very-HNWI" (VHNWI) can refer to someone with a net worth of at least US$5 million.

The Capgemini World Wealth Report 2020 defines an additional class of ultra-high-net-worth individuals (UHNWIs), those with US$30 million in investible assets.

According to The Knight Frank Wealth Report, HNWI can refer to someone with a net worth of at least US$1 million while UHNWI can refer to someone with a net worth of at least US$30 million.

, there were estimated to be just over 15 million HNWIs in the world according to the Global Citizens Report by Henley & Partners. The United States had the highest number of HNWIs (5,325,000) of any country, whilst New York is the wealthiest city with 345,000 HNWIs.

United States: SEC regulations 

The U.S. Securities and Exchange Commission requires all SEC-registered investment advisers to periodically file a report known as Form ADV. Form ADV requires each investment adviser to state how many of their clients are "high-net-worth individuals", among other details; its Glossary of Terms explains that a "high-net-worth individual" is a person who is either a "qualified client" under rule 205-3 of the Advisers Act (currently a person with at least $1,100,000 managed by the reporting investment adviser, or whose net worth the investment adviser reasonably believes exceeds $2,200,000 without counting their primary residence) or who is a "qualified purchaser" as defined in section 2(a)(51)(A) of the Investment Company Act of 1940). The Dodd-Frank Wall Street Reform Act mandated that the definition of a qualified client be reviewed every five years and adjusted for inflation. The net worth of an individual for SEC purposes may include assets held jointly with his or her spouse. Unlike the definitions used in the financial and banking trade, the SEC's definition of HNWI would include the value of a person's verifiable non-financial assets, such as a primary residence or art collection.

Annual World Wealth Report 

The World Wealth Report was co-published by Merrill Lynch and Capgemini, previously known as Cap Gemini Ernst & Young who worked together since c. 1993, investigating the "needs of high-net-worth individuals" to "successfully serve this market segment". Their first annual World Wealth Report was published in 1996.

The World Wealth Report defines HNWIs as those who hold at least US$1 million in assets excluding primary residence and ultra-HNWIs as those who hold at least US$30 million in assets excluding primary residence. The report states that in 2008 there were 8.6 million HNWIs worldwide, a decline of 14.9% from 2007.  The total HNWI wealth worldwide totaled US$32.8 trillion, a 19.5% decrease from 2007.  The ultra-HNWIs experienced the greater loss, losing 24.6% in population size and 23.9% in accumulated wealth. The report revised its 2007 projections that HNWI financial wealth would reach US$59.1 trillion by 2012 and revised this downward to a 2013 HNWI wealth valued at $48.5 trillion advancing at an annual rate of 8.1%.

The 2018 World Wealth Report  was jointly produced by Capgemini and RBC Wealth Management and included, for the first time, the Global HNW Insights Survey produced in collaboration with Scorpio Partnership. The inaugural survey represented one of the largest and most in-depth surveys of high-net-worth individuals ever conducted, surveying more than 4,400 HNWIs across 21 major wealth markets in North America, Latin America, Europe, Asia-Pacific, Middle East, and Africa.

The World Wealth Report has estimated the number and combined investable wealth of high-net-worth individuals as follows (using the United States Consumer Price Index (CPI) Inflation Calculator):

Markets 

Certain products cater to the wealthy, whose conspicuous consumption of luxury goods and services includes, for example: mansions, yachts, first-class airline tickets and private jets, and personal umbrella insurance. As economic growth has made historically expensive items affordable for the middle-class, purchases have trended towards intangible products such as education. In the United States, concierge medicine is an emerging trend as of 2017.

Banking and finance 

Most global banks, such as Santander, Barclays, BNP Paribas, Citibank, Credit Suisse, Deutsche Bank, HSBC, JPMorgan Chase, and UBS, have a separate business unit with designated teams consisting of client advisors and product specialists exclusively for UHNWI. These clients are often considered to have characteristics similar to institutional investors because the vast majority of their net worth and current income is derived from passive sources, rather than labor.

By 2006, asset managers working for HNW individuals invested more than £300 billion on behalf of their clients. These wealth managers are bankers who in 2006, earned multimillion-pound salaries and owned their own companies and equity funds. In 2006, a list of the 50 top investment bankers was published by the Spear's Wealth Management Survey.

Magazines 

Certain magazines, such as Monocle, Robb Report, and Worth, are designed for a high net worth audience.

Retail 

Brands in various sectors, such as Bentley, Maybach, and Rolls-Royce actively target UHNWI and HNWI to sell their products. In 2006, Rolls-Royce researchers suggested there were 80,000 people in ultra-high-net-worth category around the world. UHNW individuals "have, on average, eight cars and three or four homes. Three-quarters own a jet aircraft and most have a yacht."

Number of HNWIs per city 

, New York is the wealthiest city in the world with 345,000 HNWIs according to the Global Citizens Report by Henley & Partners.

Number of UHNWIs per city 

There are two different sources compiling these statistics: one the Knight Frank Wealth Report, and the other Wealth-X.

Migration of HNWIs by country 

The following table shows the countries with the highest net inflows and outflows of HNWIs in 2022 according to the annual  Henley & Partners Global Citizens Report. Figures have been rounded to the nearest 100.

See also 

 Ultra high-net-worth individual
 Billionaire
 Millionaire
 Global assets under management
 Senior management
 Professional
 Plutonomy
 Politically exposed person
 Wealth
 List of countries by wealth per adult
 Economic inequality

References

External links 

 
 

Distribution of wealth